Ivarstown is a small village in County Clare, Munster in Ireland. It takes its name from the Ievers family and is located on the opposite bank of the O'Garney river from the village of Sixmilebridge.

See also
 List of towns and villages in Ireland

References

Towns and villages in County Clare